Centrostephanus tenuispinus is a species of sea urchin of the family Diadematidae. Their armour is covered with spines. Centrostephanus tenuispinus was first scientifically described in 1914 by Hubert Lyman Clark.

References 

Diadematidae
Animals described in 1914
Taxa named by Hubert Lyman Clark